Bellator 266: Davis vs. Romero was a mixed martial arts event produced by Bellator MMA that took place on September 18, 2021, at the SAP Center in San Jose, California, United States.

Background 
Former UFC middleweight title contender Yoel Romero made his Bellator debut against Phil Davis, another former UFC contender, at this event. Romero, 44, was slated to debut for the promotion in the first round of their light heavyweight tournament against Anthony Johnson in May, but was forced to withdraw due to a medical issue concerning his eye.

The co-main event featured a bout between #4 ranked Welterweight Neiman Gracie and Mark Lemminger.

A women's flyweight bout between Alejandra Lara and DeAnna Bennett was scheduled for Bellator 263. The bout was rescheduled for unknown reasons to take place at Bellator 265. On August 13, it was announced that the bout was moved once again, this time to this event.

A lightweight bout between Adam Piccolotti and Saul Rogers was scheduled for this event. However, Piccolotti pulled out of the bout due to unknown reasons and was replaced by Georgi Karakhanyan.

Bantamweight bouts between Socrates Hernandez and Pedro Juarez and Erik Gunha versus Bobby Soronio III were scheduled for the event; however Juarez and Gunha pulled out their respective bouts so Hernandez and Soronio III instead faced each other.

Eddie Abasolo was scheduled to face Art Hernandez in a 160 pounds catchweight bout, but Hernandez did not make weight. Therefore, Abasolo did not weigh in and the bout was scrapped.

At the weigh-ins, DeAnna Bennett missed weight for her bout. Bennett weighed in at 129.2 pounds, 3.2 pounds over the flyweight non-title fight limit. The bout proceeded at catchweight and Bennett was fined a percentage of her purse which went to her opponent Alejandra Lara.

Results

Reported payout 
The following is the reported payout to the fighters as reported to the California State Athletic Commission. It is important to note the amounts do not include sponsor money, discretionary bonuses, viewership points or additional earnings. The total disclosed payout for the event was $778,800.

MAIN CARD (10 p.m. E.T., Showtime)
 Phil Davis: $100,000 def. Yoel Romero: $150,000
 Neiman Gracie: $100,000 def. Mark Lemminger: $40,000
 DeAnna Bennett: $38,600 (includes $17,000 win bonus, $5,400 deduction) def. Alejandra Lara: $27,700 ($2,700 from Bennett)
 Saul Rogers: $80,000 (includes $40,000 win bonus) def. Georgi Karakhanyan: $35,000
 Ben Parrish: $20,000 (includes $10,000 win bonus) def. Christian Edwards: $30,000

PRELIMS (7 p.m. E.T., YouTube/PlutoTV)
 Alex Polizzi: $36,000 (includes $18,000 win bonus) def. Grant Neal: $16,000
 Anthony Adams: $40,000 (includes $20,000 win bonus) def. Khalid Murtazaliev: $33,000
 Robert Seronio III: $3,000 (includes $1,500 win bonus) def. Socrates Hernandez: $2,000
 Abraham Vaesau: $6,000 (includes $3,000 win bonus) def. Albert Gonzales: $3,000
 Shane Keefe: $3,000 (includes $1,500 win bonus) def. Rhalan Gracie: $5,000
Edwin De Los Santos: $3,000 (includes $1,500 win bonus) def. Jonathan Adams: $1,500
 Jesse Delgado: $4,000 (includes $2,000 win bonus) def. Joshua Dillon: $2,000

See also 

 2021 in Bellator MMA
 List of Bellator MMA events
 List of current Bellator fighters
 Bellator MMA Rankings

References 

Events in San Jose, California
Bellator MMA events
2021 in mixed martial arts
September 2021 sports events in the United States
2021 in sports in California
Mixed martial arts in California
Sports competitions in California